Robert Field may refer to:
Robert Field (painter) (1769–1819), North American miniaturist
Robert C. Field (1804–1876), American legislator
Robert W. Field, professor of chemistry
Robert Scott Field, American actor and radio show host
Robert Isaac Field, public health academic
Robert Nettleton Field (1899–1987), New Zealand artist, sculptor, potter and art teacher

See also
Roberts Field Airport
Robert's Field
Robert Fields (born 1938), actor